The Westfield Les 4 Temps is the main shopping center in the business district of La Défense, in the western suburbs of Paris, on the territory of the commune of Puteaux in the Hauts-de-Seine.

In 2019, Les Quatre Temps is the most visited shopping center in France with 42 million visitors.

On September 12, 2019, Les 4 Temps became Westfield Les 4 Temps.

See also 
 La Défense

References

External links 
 Web Oficial Les Quatre Temps

Shopping centres in France
La Défense
Westfield Group